In music, Op. 2 stands for Opus number 2. Compositions that are assigned this number include:
 Beethoven – Piano Sonata No. 1
 Beethoven – Piano Sonata No. 2
 Beethoven – Piano Sonata No. 3
 Brahms – Piano Sonata No. 2
 Britten – Phantasy Quartet
 Chopin – Variations on "Là ci darem la mano"
 Dvořák – String Quartet No. 1 in A major
 Ginastera – Danzas Argentinas
 Goeyvaerts – Nummer 2
 Gottschalk – Bamboula
 Mendelssohn – Piano Quartet No. 2
 Mozart – Violin Sonata No. 17
 Nielsen – Fantasy Pieces for Oboe and Piano
 Popov – Chamber Symphony
 Schubert – Gretchen am Spinnrade
 Schumann – Papillons
 Scriabin – Étude in C-sharp minor, Op. 2, No. 1
 Strauss – Döblinger Réunion-Walzer
 Tchaikovsky – Souvenir de Hapsal
 Vivaldi – Twelve Violin Sonatas, Op. 2